Museum of Cultural History (KHM) is an association of museums subject to the University of Oslo, Norway.  KHM was established in 1999 as Universitetets kulturhistoriske museum with the merging of the bodies Universitetets Oldsaksamling which housed  a collection of ancient and medieval objects, Viking Ship Museum (Vikingskipshuset) at Bygdøy, the Coin Cabinet (Myntkabinettet) and Ethnographic Museum (Etnografisk samling). In 2004 the name was changed to Kulturhistorisk museum.

The activities of the Museum of Cultural History are currently localized in four main buildings in Oslo city centre: Historical Museum at Frederiks gate 2 and Frederiks gate 3 and administration at St. Olavs gate 29, as well as the Viking Ship Museum on the Bygdøy peninsula.

The Museum of Cultural History is one of Norway's largest cultural history museums. It holds the country's largest prehistoric and medieval archaeological collections, including the Viking ships at Bygdøy, a substantial collection of medieval church objects, and a rune archive. The museum also has a comprehensive ethnographic collection that includes objects from every continent, as well as Norway's largest collection of historical coins.

Gallery

References

External links
 KHM Official website
Hoen Viking Age Gold Treasure

Museums in Oslo
1999 establishments in Norway
Museums established in 1999
Ethnographic museums in Europe
University museums in Norway
University of Oslo
History museums in Norway
Archaeological museums in Norway
Numismatic museums in Europe
Viking Age museums
Art Nouveau museum buildings